Acakyra iaguara is a species of beetle in the family Cerambycidae. It was described by Martins and Galileo in 1996.

References

Beetles described in 1996
Acanthoderini